Lou Castel (born  Ulv Quarzell; 28 May 1943) is a Swedish actor who became known through his work in Italian films.

Life and career
The son of a Swedish father and an Irish mother, Castel was born Ulv Quarzell in Bogotá, Colombia, where his father was working as a diplomat. He and his twin brother grew up in Cartagena. 

When Castel was 6, his parents separated. He followed his mother to Europe and went to school in London, very briefly at Dartington Hall School with his sister Solveig, then in Stockholm. He subsequently went to live in Rome where his mother was working in the local film industry. A communist, Castel's mother also introduced her son to politics. 

Interested in acting from an early age, he attended the Centro Sperimentale di Cinematografia, but was quickly kicked out. His first movie role was an uncredited extra in The Leopard (1963). Two years later, he gained international fame for his performance  in Fists in the Pocket, in which he played  the epileptic Alessandro, who murders his mother and his brother. His career in Italy included arthouse pictures, but also Spaghetti Westerns and also softcore erotica. He enjoyed particular success with his starring roles in Damiano Damiani's A Bullet for the General (1967), Salvatore Samperi's Come Play with Me (1968) and Umberto Lenzi's Orgasmo (1969). He later played Jeff, the temperamental bisexual film director in the German production Beware of a Holy Whore (1971), directed by Rainer Werner Fassbinder.  

While living in Italy, Castel became involved in a maoist organization, the Union of Italian Communists (Marxist–Leninist). As Italy was going through the Years of Lead period, he was eventually considered an undesirable alien. In 1972, he was deported to Sweden where he no longer had any acquaintances. For a time, he had to rely on subsidies sent to him from Italy by his organization. However, he quickly bounced back and appeared, mostly as a character actor, in various European films, directed by filmmakers such as Wim Wenders and Claude Chabrol. 

Castel settled in France in the early 1990s. Though the quality of the films he acted in were quite disparate, ranging from arthouse films to cheap exploitation, Castel had a preference for roles that reflected his extreme leftist beliefs. He portrayed left-wing terrorists in Nada (1974), The Cassandra Crossing (1976), Could It Happen Here? (1977) and Year of the Gun (1991).

He has a son from the actress Marcella Michelangeli.

A polyglot, Castel speaks a number of languages but jokes that he has no real natural mother tongue and speaks every language with an accent, except for Swedish which he no longer has opportunities to use.

Selected filmography

References

Footnotes

Sources

External links

Lou Castel, "My 'State of Things'," tr. by Rainer J. Hanshe, Hyperion: On the Future of Aesthetics (spring 2014) 278–280.
Lou Castel, "Before / After the filming of The Stoning of St. Stephen," tr. by Rainer J. Hanshe, Hyperion: On the Future of Aesthetics (spring 2014) 281–288.

1943 births

Living people
Centro Sperimentale di Cinematografia alumni
20th-century Swedish male actors
21st-century Swedish male actors
Swedish male film actors
Swedish expatriates in Colombia
Swedish expatriates in Italy
Swedish expatriates in France
Swedish communists
Swedish people of Irish descent